Eads is the Statutory Town that is the county seat and the most populous municipality of Kiowa County, Colorado, United States. The town population was 672 at the 2020 United States Census.

History
Eads has been the seat of Kiowa County since 1901. Eads was established in 1887 as a railroad town and was named after James Buchanan Eads, a structural engineer with the Missouri Pacific Railroad, who designed and built the Eads Bridge over the Mississippi River at St. Louis in 1874 and went on to design and build the system of levees on the Mississippi Delta which made the river navigable by ocean-going vessels. In the town, there are many historic houses and buildings that are still in use to this day; on Maine Street, there are many places to visit to learn more about the town's history. Since 2007, there is an annual event where the local businesses of Eads are supported called the Maine street bash; it includes many activities and live performances.

The original name of Eads was Dayton.

Geography
Eads is located at  (38.480465, −102.780763).

Climate

Demographics

As of the census of 2000, there were 747 people, 320 households, and 193 families residing in the town. The racial makeup of the town was 95.85% White, 0.67% African American, 0.80% Native American, 1.47% from other races, and 1.20% from two or more races. Hispanic or Latino of any race were 2.95% of the population.

There were 320 households, out of which 25.3% had children under the age of 18 living with them, 50.0% were married couples living together, 7.5% had a female householder with no husband present, and 39.4% were non-families. 35.6% of all households were made up of individuals, and 20.3% had someone living alone who was 65 years of age or older.  The average household size was 2.26 and the average family size was 2.93.

In the town, the population was spread out, with 23.4% under the age of 18, 7.5% from 18 to 24, 24.1% from 25 to 44, 23.2% from 45 to 64, and 21.8% who were 65 years of age or older.  The median age was 41 years. For every 100 females, there were 99.7 males.  For every 100 females age 18 and over, there were 93.2 males.

The median income for a household in the town was $27,024, and the median income for a family was $35,625. Males had a median income of $29,375 versus $19,792 for females. The per capita income for the town was $16,944.  About 7.0% of families and 12.0% of the population were below the poverty line, including 15.8% of those under age 18 and 13.5% of those age 65 or over.

Education
During the 2006–2007 school year, the Eads school district had a total of 165 students enrolled in kindergarten through 12th grade. Eads High School had 65 students during the 2006–2007 school year. Partially because of its small size, Eads High School was the first high school in the state of Colorado to provide notebook computers for each of its students and to move to a computer-based curriculum.

See also

Colorado
Bibliography of Colorado
Index of Colorado-related articles
Outline of Colorado
List of counties in Colorado
List of municipalities in Colorado
List of places in Colorado

References

External links

Town of Eads website
CDOT map of the Town of Eads

Towns in Kiowa County, Colorado
Towns in Colorado
County seats in Colorado
Populated places established in 1907
1907 establishments in Colorado